Ronald Kenneth Leo Collins (born July 31, 1949) is the co-founder and co-director of the History Book Festival and co-founder and co-chair of the First Amendment Salons. He served as a law clerk to Justice Hans Linde on the Oregon Supreme Court and was a Supreme Court fellow under Chief Justice Warren Burger. He was the Harold S. Shefelman Scholar at the University of Washington School of Law. In 2011, Collins became the book editor for SCOTUSblog. He is the editor of the weekly online blog First Amendment News and editor of Attention (an online journal on the life and legacy of Simone Weil). He is also the Lewes Public Library's Distinguished Lecturer.

Biography
Born in Santa Monica, California, Collins grew up in Southern California. He graduated from the University of California at Santa Barbara with a B.A. degree in political philosophy. He received a J.D. degree from Loyola Law School in Los Angeles, where he was a member of the Law Review.

He is the author, co-author (with David Skover), or editor of 12 books on a variety of topics such as constitutional law, First Amendment law, robotics and artificial intelligence, popular culture, dissent, campaign finance laws, contract law, and judging. These and other books included works on Justice Oliver Wendell Holmes, Simone Weil, Lenny Bruce, Jack Kerouac, Allen Ginsberg, Lawrence Ferlinghetti, and Floyd Abrams. His latest two books are A Declaration of Duties Toward Humankind: A Critical Companion to Simone Weil's The Need for Roots (2023, co-edited with Eric Springsted) and Tragedy on Trial (2023), a work on the 1955 Emmett Till murder trial. The third edition of his book The Death of Discourse was released in 2022. His scholarly articles have appeared in the Harvard Law Review, Stanford Law Review, University of Chicago Law Review, Supreme Court Review, and the Michigan Law Review, among others. His popular press articles or reviews have appeared in The New York Times, The Washington Post, Los Angeles Times, Chicago Tribune, The Baltimore Sun, The Forward, and The Nation.

References

External links

Lawyers from Washington, D.C.
American legal writers
University of California, Santa Barbara alumni
First Amendment scholars
Temple University faculty
George Washington University faculty
1949 births
Living people
University of Washington School of Law faculty
People from Santa Monica, California
Loyola Law School alumni